Stevens School may refer to:

in the United States (by state)
 Stevens High School (New Hampshire), in Claremont, New Hampshire
 Stevens High School (Lancaster, Pennsylvania), listed on the NRHP
 Thaddeus Stevens School of Observation, Philadelphia, Pennsylvania, listed on the NRHP
 Stevens Elementary School (Pittsburgh), in Pittsburgh, Pennsylvania
 Stevens School (York, Pennsylvania), listed on the NRHP in Pennsylvania
 Stevens High School (South Dakota), in Rapid City, South Dakota
 John Paul Stevens High School, San Antonio, Texas
 Thaddeus Stevens School (Washington, D.C.), listed on the  NRHP in Washington, D.C.
 Stevens Point State Normal School, Stevens Point, Wisconsin, listed NRHP
 Stevens School (Seattle), Seattle, Washington

See also
Stevens Institute of Technology
Stevens High School (disambiguation)